Timo Raphael Righetti (born 2 May 1998) is a Swiss professional footballer who plays as a defender.

Professional career
Righetti made his professional debut for Thun in a 3-1 Swiss Super League win over BSC Young Boys on 3 December 2017.

International career
Righetti is a youth international for Switzerland.

References

External links
 
 SFL Profile
 Thun Profile

1998 births
Living people
Swiss men's footballers
Switzerland youth international footballers
Swiss people of Italian descent
FC Thun players
Swiss Super League players
Association football defenders